Svein-Erik Edvartsen (born 21 May 1979) is a Norwegian football referee and sports management professional.

Career 

He debuted as a first division referee on 11 August 2002 in the game between Skeid and Tromsdalen. He debuted as a referee in the Norwegian Premier League in 2006. Edvartsen is also a referee principal in the Norwegian Ice Hockey Federation and represents Hamar IL (football) and Storhamar Dragons (hockey).
In 2010, an IK Start chairman called Edvartsen a "Tandori referee". The case received extensive press coverage. Edvartsen became a FIFA referee in 2013.

He is at present the CEO of the ice hockey club Lørenskog, and has previously been CEO at Storhamar and football club Hamarkameratene.

Personal life 

Edvartsen was born in Oslo on 21 May 1979, and has lived in Norway since. His grandparents are from Pakistan.

References

1979 births
Living people
Norwegian football referees
Sportspeople from Oslo
Norwegian ice hockey officials
Norwegian people of Pakistani descent